The 1953–54 OB I bajnokság season was the 17th season of the OB I bajnokság, the top level of ice hockey in Hungary. Seven teams participated in the league, and Postas Budapest won the championship.

Regular season

External links
 Season on hockeyarchives.info

Hun
OB I bajnoksag seasons
1953–54 in Hungarian ice hockey